Jennifer Armstrong (born August 1, 1992) is a Canadian curler from White City, Saskatchewan. She currently plays second on Team Nancy Martin and plays mixed doubles With Brad Jacobs. She is a three-time New Brunswick Scotties Tournament of Hearts champion.

Career

Juniors
Armstrong's first national level event was at the 2011 Canadian Junior Curling Championships. There, she skipped her team to a 7–5 round robin record. In 2012 she went on to represent New Brunswick again at the Canadian Juniors. In 2014, she represented UNB at the 2014 CIS/CCA Curling Championships.

Women's
Out of juniors, Armstrong joined the Melissa Adams rink at third. They competed in local World Curling Tour events with their best finish at the WFG Jim Sullivan Curling Classic where they won the title. At the 2016 New Brunswick Scotties Tournament of Hearts, the team made it all the way to the final where they just came up short to Team Robichaud.

The following season, the Adams rink returned to the provincial championship. After going 4–2 in the round robin, the team won the tiebreaker and the semifinal to advance to the final. There, they scored four points in the sixth end en route to a 9–6 win. It was just Armstrong's second provincial appearance. At the Hearts, the team would have to win the pre-qualifying event to qualify for the main draw. After going 3–0 in the round robin portion, they came up short in the final against Northwest Territories Kerry Galusha.

Adams left the team after the season to join the Robichaud rink. Armstrong stepped up to skip with Cathlia Ward playing third, Katie Forward remaining at lead and Jillian Babin coming in to play second. At provincials, the team lost in the semi-final to Sarah Mallais.

After Ward moved to skip her own team in Newfoundland and Labrador, the team brought on veteran Andrea Crawford to skip the team with Armstrong sliding down to second. At the 2019 New Brunswick Scotties Tournament of Hearts, Team Crawford posted a perfect 5–0 record en route to capturing the title. At the Hearts, the team went 3–4, missing the playoffs.

To start the 2019–20 curling season, Team Crawford won their first two events, the Steele Cup Cash and the Atlantic Superstore Monctonian Challenge. They played in a Grand Slam event, the 2019 Tour Challenge Tier 2. After a 2–2 round robin record, they lost the tiebreaker to Jestyn Murphy. The team defended their provincial title by winning the 2020 New Brunswick Scotties Tournament of Hearts in late January 2020. At the Hearts, the Crawford rink started with three losses before rallying off four wins in a row including scoring a seven ender against top-seeded Manitoba's Kerri Einarson rink to win 13–7 and defeating Team Canada (skipped by Chelsea Carey) 7–5. Their 4–3 round robin record qualified them for the tiebreaker against Saskatchewan's Robyn Silvernagle rink. Saskatchewan took two in the extra end for a 9–7 victory, eliminating New Brunswick from contention. After the season, Armstrong announced she would be moving to Saskatchewan for the 2020–21 season.

On March 19, 2020, it was announced that Armstrong would be joining the new team of Stephanie Schmidt, Brooklyn Stevenson, and Rachel Erickson. The team played in three local events during the abbreviated season, qualifying in one of them. After the season, Brooklyn Stevenson left the team. Armstrong, Schmidt and Erickson then added Chelsea Carey and Jolene Campbell for the 2021–22 season, shifting Armstrong to lead.

The new Team Carey found success in just their second event together, going undefeated to claim the Craven SPORTS Services Curling Classic tour event title. They then made the semifinals of the 2021 Curlers Corner Autumn Gold Curling Classic where they were eliminated by Tabitha Peterson. At the event, however, they were able to defeat the likes of Rachel Homan, Jennifer Jones and Jamie Sinclair en route to the semifinals. They also qualified for the playoffs at the Boundary Ford Curling Classic, SaskTour Women's Moose Jaw, Red Deer Curling Classic and the DeKalb Superspiel, however, were not able to reach the final in any of the four events. Their next event was the 2022 Saskatchewan Scotties Tournament of Hearts, which they entered as the top ranked team. Team Carey qualified through the A-side of the tournament with a perfect 3–0 record. This earned them a spot in the 1 vs. 2 page playoff game where they defeated Penny Barker. In the final, they once again faced the Barker rink. This time, Team Barker would win the match 7–5, despite Team Carey beating them in both the A Final and 1 vs. 2 page playoff game. Despite this, they still qualified for the 2022 Scotties Tournament of Hearts as Wild Card #2 after Curling Canada used the same format from the 2021 event due to the pandemic. At the championship, the team finished with a 4–4 round robin record, not advancing to the playoff round. Team Carey wrapped up their season at the 2022 Players' Championship where they missed the playoffs.

On April 3, 2022, the team announced that they would be disbanding at the end of the 2021–22 season. Armstrong and Schmidt later announced that they would be joining Nancy Martin and Krysten Karwacki on a newly formed team for the 2022–23 season. Martin would skip the team, with Schmidt playing third, Armstrong at second and Karwacki at lead.

Personal life
Armstrong currently works as a manager of advisory services for Virtus Group LLP. She is in a relationship with fellow curler Catlin Schneider.

Teams

References

External links

1992 births
Canadian women curlers
Curlers from New Brunswick
Curlers from Saskatchewan
Living people
Sportspeople from Saint John, New Brunswick
People from Kings County, New Brunswick
21st-century Canadian women